Dui Purush may refer to:

 Dui Purush (1945 film), a 1945 Bengali film
 Dui Purush (1978 film), a 1978 Bengali film